The women's 20 kilometres walk event at the 2006 Commonwealth Games was held on March 20.

Results

References
Results

Walk
2006
2006 in women's athletics